The 10.5 cm FlaK 38 was a German anti-aircraft gun used during World War II by the Luftwaffe. An improved version was introduced as the 10.5 cm FlaK 39.

Development

Land version 
The Flak 38 was introduced as a competitor to the 8.8 cm FlaK 18. In this role it proved to be too heavy for field use while having roughly similar performance as the 88 mm, therefore it was used primarily in static mounts.

The Flak 39 was an improved version, which replaced the electrical gun laying system with a mechanical one.

Naval version 
The 10.5 cm SK C/33  was used by the Kriegsmarine, the German Navy. In the late 1940s, the French also planned to equip the battleship Richelieu with twelve of these mountings, but the project was cancelled due to credit shortage.

They were mounted in pairs on an electrically powered tri-axial mounting, intended to compensate for the motion of the ship and maintain a lock onto the intended target.  The mounting was not properly waterproofed and as the mountings were open to the weather and sea swell, this resulted in a high maintenance burden.

References

References
10.5 cm Flak 38, 39: Multi-Purpose Gun 
German 10.5 cm/65 (4.1") SK C/33

External links

Anti-aircraft guns of Germany
World War II anti-aircraft guns
World War II artillery of Germany
105 mm artillery
Rheinmetall
Military equipment introduced in the 1930s